John Derry (19 June 1811 – 28 June 1870) was an Irish prelate who served as Bishop of Clonfert.

He was born in Dublin. Coen was ordained priest in 1834. Coen was consecrated Bishop of Clonfert on 21 September 1847, a post he held until his death.

References

Roman Catholic bishops of Clonfert
19th-century Roman Catholic bishops in Ireland
1811 births
1870 deaths
Christian clergy from Dublin (city)